Andrea Drahota (born 15 July 1941) is a Hungarian actress. She appeared in more than thirty films since 1964.

Selected filmography

References

External links
 

1941 births
Living people
People from Veszprém
Hungarian film actresses
Hungarian television actresses